Flowerfield was a station along the Port Jefferson Branch of the Long Island Rail Road in Saint James, New York. 

The station opened in 1910 on a  parcel purchased by John Lewis Childs to grow plants and seeds, which was later acquired by the Gyrodyne Company of America. The second floor of the station even had a small greenhouse. The station agency closed in 1944. On July 2, 1959, the LIRR petitioned with the New York State Public Service Commission for permission to discontinue all passenger services and team tracks at the station.

Reopening the Flowerfield station, along with a closure of the St. James station, was proposed in the mid-1990s as part of a plan to redevelop the Gyrodyne site.

References

External links
Old Flowerfield Station image (Unofficial LIRR History)

Railway stations in the United States opened in 1910
Railway stations closed in 1958
Smithtown, New York
1910 establishments in New York (state)
1958 disestablishments in New York (state)
Former Long Island Rail Road stations in Suffolk County, New York